Cirroteuthis muelleri was the first cirrate octopus species (and genus) to be scientifically described (in 1836). It is closely related to the genus Cirrothauma within the family Cirroteuthidae. At present the genus contains a single recognized species restricted to the Arctic Ocean and northern basins of the Atlantic and Pacific, but other species may be present in the southern hemisphere.

Description
Cirroteuthis muelleri can reach a maximum length of 400 mm (mantle length 170 mm). Statements that C. muelleri reaches up to 1.5 m total length are erroneous (and involve unidentified Cirrothauma, then regarded as Cirroteuthis sp., being mistakenly assumed to be C. muelleri). It is off white or pale purple, with the inner side of the arms and the webs being brownish-purple.

The head has well developed eyes with lenses. The upper and lower beaks are thin and relatively weak. The body is gelatinous and fragile. The arms are nearly equal in length. A pair of translucent webs joins the dorsal and ventral sides of the arms together and the webs terminate at a nodule. The first 7 or 8 suckers are cup-shaped and raised on thick stalks, numbers 2 and 3 being the largest. There are a further 30 or so smaller suckers with delicate stalks. These are elongate, fleshy tendrils set along the sides of the oral surface of the arms, the longest being in the mid-arm region. Both the suckers and the cirri do not extend as far as the tip of the arm.

The fins are elliptical when viewed from the side. They are wide, and longer than the width of the head. The aperture of the mantle is narrow and the funnel is long. It has been nicknamed "Dumbo" after the cartoon elephant of that name, because its fins resemble large ears.

Distribution
Cirroteuthis muelleri is a deep sea species. It is found in cold seas in the boreal Arctic, the north Atlantic Ocean, and the north Pacific Ocean. In the southern hemisphere at least three specimens have been captured of Cirroteuthis cf. muelleri from New Zealand and Australia, which may represent a new species.

Habitat
At these depths, practically no light penetrates, the temperature is about 4 °C, and observation is only possible by submersible, which makes these octopuses difficult to collect. Their ecology and biology are little known, but they seem to be fairly common in the seas around Greenland.

Biology
The eggs were found to be large and were laid on the bottom, singly. The diet of C. muelleri (from stomach contents of 18 specimens) was found to comprise small crustaceans (Calanoida, Mysidacea, Isopoda) and polychaetes (Polynoidae), all small benthic or epibenthic prey items. The largest mysids consumed were estimated at 14.6 mm long, and the largest polychaete was estimated at 24.3 mm.

References

Octopuses
Monotypic mollusc genera
Cephalopods of Oceania
Molluscs of the Pacific Ocean
Molluscs of the Atlantic Ocean